John Haines Ware III (August 29, 1908 – July 29, 1997) was an American politician who served as a Republican member of the U.S. House of Representatives for Pennsylvania's 9th congressional district from 1970 to 1973 and Pennsylvania's 5th congressional district from 1973 to 1975.  He also served as a member of the Pennsylvania Senate for the 19th district from 1961 to 1970.

Early life and education
Ware was born in Vineland, New Jersey. He graduated from the Wharton School of the University of Pennsylvania in 1930. He founded the Penn Fuel Gas Company and served as its president for 45 years.  He also served as Chair of the Board for American Water.

Political career
He served as burgess of the borough of Oxford, Pennsylvania from 1956 to 1960. He was a member of the Pennsylvania State Senate for the 19th district from 1961 to 1970 and chairman of the Pennsylvania Republican finance committee. He was a trustee of the Lincoln University and the University of Pennsylvania.

He was elected simultaneously as a Republican to the 91st and to the 92nd Congress by special election to fill the vacancy caused by the death of George Watkins, and was reelected to the 93rd Congress, (November 3, 1970 – January 3, 1975); He was not a candidate for reelection in 1974.

Death and interment
He died on July 29, 1997 in Lancaster, Pennsylvania and is interred at the Oxford Cemetery.

Legacy

The middle college house in the Quadrangle Dormitories at the University of Pennsylvania is named in his honor.

A Boy Scout and Cub Scout camp is also named in his honor. Part of the Horseshoe Scout Reservation, Camp John H. Ware III hosts many programs for scouting such as summer camps, NYLT, and camporees.

In 1999, the Ware family established the John H. Ware 3rd Endowed Professorship in Alzheimer's Research at the University of Pennsylvania Perelman School of Medicine in his honor.

On May 31, 2002, the U.S. Route 1 freeway in Chester County between the Maryland border and Kennett Square was designated the John H. Ware III Memorial Highway in honor of Ware, who pushed for the construction of the US 1 freeway in Chester County.

Footnotes

References

|-

1908 births
1997 deaths
20th-century American politicians
20th-century American writers
Burials in Pennsylvania
The Daily Pennsylvanian people
Republican Party Pennsylvania state senators
People from Vineland, New Jersey
Republican Party members of the United States House of Representatives from Pennsylvania
Wharton School of the University of Pennsylvania alumni